The Observer–Reporter is a daily newspaper covering Washington County, Greene County, and the Mon Valley in Pennsylvania, with some overlap into the South Hills of Pittsburgh in. The newspaper was published by the Observer Publishing Company in the city of Washington, Pennsylvania.

The Observer Publishing Co. was formed on July 24, 1902, by John L. Stewart and E.F. Acheson. Stewart's grandsons, John L.S. Northrop and William B. Northrop, owned and ran the company until their retirements in June 2002, when ownership was transferred to the fourth generation, which included the children of John and William. Thomas Northrop served as publisher and president from 2002 until 2018. The paper has had a long involvement and investment in the local community.

Ownership has recently been transferred to Ogden Newspapers.

References

External links
  

Daily newspapers published in Pennsylvania
Washington County, Pennsylvania
Greene County, Pennsylvania
Washington, Pennsylvania